The 2004 season of the Toppserien, the highest women's football (soccer) league in Norway, began on 17 April 2004 and ended on 30 October 2004.

18 games were played with 3 points given for wins and 1 for draws. Number nine and ten were relegated, while the two top teams from the First Division were promoted.

Røa won the league one point ahead of Trondheims-Ørn.

League table

Top goalscorers
 20 goals:
  Kristy Moore, Fløya
 17 goals:
  Elene Moseby, Team Strømmen
  Ragnhild Gulbrandsen, Trondheims-Ørn
 12 goals:
  Tonje Hansen, Kolbotn
 11 goals:
  Melissa Wiik, Asker
 10 goals:
  Solveig Gulbrandsen, Kolbotn
 9 goals:
  Ingrid Camilla Fosse Sæthre, Arna-Bjørnar
  Kjersti Thun, Asker
  Tone Heimlund, Fløya
  Siv Elin Byberg, Klepp
 8 goals:
  Heidi Pedersen, Trondheims-Ørn

Promotion and relegation
 Arna-Bjørnar and Medkila were relegated to the First Division
 Kattem and Liungen were promoted from the First Division.

References
League table
Fixtures
Goalscorers

Toppserien seasons
Top level Norwegian women's football league seasons
1
Nor
Nor